Bank Forum (full name – Public Joint-Stock Company "BANK FORUM") was a Ukrainian bank headquartered in Kyiv, Ukraine. Founded in 1994 , the bank was acquired by Smart Holding in 2012.

Ownership and management

On September 17, 2007 the shareholders of PJSC "BANK FORUM" and Commerzbank AG (Germany) have signed an agreement on acquisition by Commerzbank AG of 60% plus one share of Bank Forum.
As of 01.11.2011, Commerzbank AG owns a 96.06% stake in PJSC "BANK FORUM".
Shareholders: Commerzbank AG - 96,06% State Street Bank and Trust Company - 1,50% Other shareholders - 2.44%
Chairman of the Board of Bank Forum Commerzbank Group is Vadym Berezovyk.

July 30, 2012 Commerzbank sold its stake to Ukrainian Smart Group.

The bank is currently under liquidation according to the National Bank of Ukraine.

Activities

Bank Forum was a founded in 1994 and operated in Ukraine.

Bank Forum was a universal bank which offered a range of banking services.

The bank’s annual financial statements were confirmed by independent international auditors. Every year Bank Forum was rated by Moody's Investors Service (since 2004; ratings as of 1 December 2011: B1/B3) and Fitch Ratings (since 2006; rating as of 1 December 2011 is B).

Since 2001 Bank Forum cooperated with the European Bank for Reconstruction and Development (EBRD), implementing in Ukraine a number of joint programs. Programs included Lending Program for Small and Medium-Size Business, Microlending Program, Trade Facilitation Program, Mortgage Lending Program. In December 2007 Bank Forum became a participant of the all-Ukrainian EBRD program on energy efficiency increase.

Bank Forum was the first Ukrainian banking institution to conduct private placement of 10% of its shares among foreign investors (in 2005), and in 2006 issued and successfully placed Eurobonds.

Bank Membership

 MasterCard International
 VISA International (principal member)
 Association of Ukrainian Banks (AUB)
 EBRD Agent for a number of business financing programs
 American Chamber of Commerce in Ukraine (ACCU)
 Deposit Guarantee Fund
 First All-Ukrainian Bureau of Credit Histories
 Ukrainian Interbank Currency Exchange
 Professional Association of Registrars and Depositories
 Ukrainian Credit-Bank Union
 PFTS Stock Exchange
 Joint ATM network ATMoSfera
 Joint ATM network Euronet

References

External links
 

1994 establishments in Ukraine
2014 disestablishments in Ukraine
Defunct banks of Ukraine
Banks established in 1994
Banks disestablished in 2014